Ernest Leonard Blumenschein (May 26, 1874  – June 6, 1960) was an American artist and founding member of the Taos Society of Artists. He is noted for paintings of Native Americans, New Mexico and the American Southwest.

Early life and education
Ernest Blumenschein was born on May 26, 1874 in Pittsburgh, Pennsylvania.  In 1877, his father accepted a position as director of the Dayton Philharmonic in Ohio, where Blumenschein grew up.  When he finished high school, Blumenschein received a scholarship to study violin at the Cincinnati College of Music.

While in Cincinnati, he also attended an illustration course from Fernand Lungren at the Cincinnati Art Academy, causing him to change his studies from music to art.  He moved to New York City in 1892, studying at the  Art Students League of New York. Attracted by the idea of studying art in Europe, he  enrolled at the Académie Julian in Paris in 1894. There he met and became friends with Bert Phillips and the older and more experienced artist Joseph Henry Sharp, who told the two younger artists about his 1893 visit to Taos, New Mexico.

Career

Blumenschein returned to New York in 1896, to work as an illustrator in a studio shared with Bert Phillips. In early 1898, he took an assignment that required him to travel to Arizona and New Mexico. That Spring, he convinced Phillips to join him on a second journey to the American West. Their first stop was Denver, Colorado, where they bought art and camping supplies, a wagon, horses and a revolver. Thus equipped, they set out with the intention of reaching Mexico.

In northern New Mexico, the rough road caused a wagon wheel to break. Blumenschein brought the wheel to be repaired in nearby Taos, leaving Phillips alone with the wagon. When Blumenschein returned three days later with the repaired wheel, they continued to Taos, where they sold their horse and equipage, set up a studio and began to paint.

Blumenschein stayed in Taos for three months, returning to New York to resume his career as an illustrator of popular magazines and books (including two short stories by Jack London), while Phillips remained in Taos. Blumenschein returned twice to Paris to pursue further studies at Académie Julian: once in 1899 and again from 1902 to 1909. During the latter stay, he met and married artist Mary Shepard Greene.

The couple returned to New York in 1909, where they worked as an illustration team. Blumenschein also took a teaching position at his alma mater, the Art Students League of New York.

From 1910, he spent his summers in Taos. In 1915, he became a co-founder of the Taos Society of Artists, together with his friends Bert Phillips, Joseph Henry Sharp, and three other artists. He finally settled permanently in Taos in 1919. From 1920 to 1921 he served as president of the Society. In 1923, he refused to accept the position of secretary of the Society, giving his commitment to an office of The New Mexico Painters, another group he had helped form, as his reason for the refusal. The other members of the Society refused to accept his excuse, and after a heated argument, Blumenschein resigned from the Society.

The style of painting of the Taos painters was to decisively influence the perceptions that the wider world came to have of the American Southwest, specifically of the Pueblo and Navajo Indian peoples.

During World War I, Blumenschein led a national effort to produce range-finder paintings used to help train military gunners.

Honors and awards
In 1910, Blumenschein was elected into the National Academy of Design as an Associate member, and became a full member in 1927. In 1947 he was awarded an Honorary Master of Arts from University of New Mexico and the following year he was named Honorary Fellow in Fine Arts by the School of American Research.

Collections

Paintings by Blumenschein are held in the Eiteljorg Museum of American Indians and Western Art in Indianapolis, Indiana, the Harwood Museum of Art in Taos, the Taos Art Museum and Fechin House, the New Mexico Museum of Art  in Santa Fe, and the El Paso Art Museum in El Paso, Texas.

See also
 Ernest L. Blumenschein House, his home in Taos, New Mexico
 Oscar E. Berninghaus
 E. Irving Couse
 W. Herbert Dunton
 E. Martin Hennings

Notes

References

Further reading

External links

Denver Art Museum: In Contemporary Rhythm: The Art of Ernest L. Blumenschein
Museum Association of Taos: E.L. Blumenschein Home and Museum
PBS NewsHour: Witness to the American West (narrated slide show)
Phoenix Art Museum: In Contemporary Rhythm: The Art of Ernest L. Blumenschein
A finding aid to the Ernest Blumenschein papers, 1873-1964, in the Archives of American Art, Smithsonian Institution
 
 
 

Paintings
Afternoon of a Sheepherder (1939)
Haystack, Taos Valley (prior to 1927, reworked 1940)
Jury for Trial of a Sheepherder for Murder (1936)
Ourselves and Taos Neighbors (1931)
Paris Apartment (1906–1909)
Portrait of Albedia (ca. 1918)
Taos Valley and Mountain
Yellow Cottonwoods
Dance at Taos

American landscape painters
Artists of the American West
Modern artists
Taos Society of Artists
1874 births
1960 deaths
Artists from Taos, New Mexico
Académie Julian alumni
Art Students League of New York alumni
Artists from Dayton, Ohio
19th-century American painters
American male painters
20th-century American painters
Artists from Pittsburgh
National Academy of Design members
19th-century American male artists
20th-century American male artists